The 1981–82 USAC Championship Car season consisted of six races, beginning in Speedway, Indiana, on May 24, 1981, and concluding at the same location on May 30, 1982.  The USAC National Champion was George Snider.  The season included two Indianapolis 500 races.  The 1981 winner was Bobby Unser, while the 1982 winner was Gordon Johncock.  The schedule included dirt courses for the first time since 1970.

By this  time, the preeminent national championship season was instead sanctioned by CART.

Schedule and results
The United States Auto Club formed the Gold Crown Series in 1981 which was a combination of the Indianapolis 500 and other races including races on dirt tracks. It was set up so that season would extend over the course of two years with the final race of the season being the Indianapolis 500, with all races running on Oval/Speedway courses.

 Scheduled for 500 miles, stopped early due to rain.

The season opened with the 1981 Indianapolis 500 at the Indianapolis Motor Speedway and Bobby Unser would win. Wally Dallenbach Sr. qualified the #40 car for Mario Andretti. However, after the race USAC officials penalized Unser 1 position and the win went to Andretti. Even if Andretti failed to win he would still go into the Van Scoy Diamond Mines 500 at Pocono International Raceway as the points leader as he was in possession of a USAC Class 1 License. The Van Scoy Diamond Mines 500 was won by A. J. Foyt getting Foyt his 67th and final USAC Gold Crown win. The race was cut from 500 miles down to 305 miles due to rain. At the Tony Bettenhausen 100 at the Illinois State Fairgrounds was won by George Snider for his first and only win in USAC Gold Crown competition. At the DuQuoin State Fairgrounds Rich Vogler would win his first and only race in USAC Gold Crown competition. At the Hoosier Hundred at the Indiana State Fairgrounds Larry Rice would win his only USAC Gold Crown race. The 1981 Indianapolis 500 results were changed to Bobby Unser winning the race over Mario Andretti, costing Andretti 200 points. The season ending 1982 Indianapolis 500 at the Indianapolis 500 was marred by the death of Gordon Smiley during qualifying (he was 36 years old), and at the start 2nd place starter Kevin Cogan would spin into A. J. Foyt's car and Mario Andretti's car, while further back in the field Roger Mears, Dale Whittington, and Bobby Rahal would collide. However, Foyt and Rahal were able to continue. Gordon Johncock would beat Rick Mears to the line to win his second Indianapolis 500. George Snider would win the championship with Geoff Brabham 2nd, Tom Bigelow 3rd, A. J. Foyt 4th, and Gordon Johncock 5th.

Final points standings

See also
 1981 Indianapolis 500
 1982 Indianapolis 500
 1981 CART PPG Indy Car World Series
 1982 CART PPG Indy Car World Series

References
 
 
 

USAC Championship Car season
USAC Championship Car season
USAC Championship Car